Heinrich Peter Hellwege (born 18 August 1908 in Neuenkirchen; died 4 October 1991 in Neuenkirchen) was a German politician (DHP, DP and CDU). Hellwege was Federal Minister for Affairs of the Federal Council (1949–1955) and Minister President of Lower Saxony (1955–1959).

When he left secondary school in 1926 he started to work as a commercial clerk in Hamburg until in 1933 he joined the family business for six years. During World War II he served with the air force. After the war he turned into a political entrepreneur who restarted a political party, the Niedersächsische Landespartei (NLP), later on to be renamed DP, and began his own political career. The first and the last position held by Hellwege was M.P. in the state legislature of Lower Saxony (1947–49 and 1959–63). Between 1947 and 1961 he was national chairman of the German Party (Deutsche Partei). When his party, the DP, started to fade away he joined the Christian Democratic Union (1961–79) without ever being a candidate for that party.

See also
 German Party (1947)

References

Bibliography
 Claudius Schmidt: Heinrich Hellwege, der vergessene Gründervater: Ein politisches Lebensbild. Stade: Landschaftsverband der Ehemaligen Herzogtümer Bremen und Verden, 1991,  (Ph.D. dissertation, Berlin: Free University, 1990)
 Joachim Detjen: 'Heinrich Hellwege', in: Udo Kempf and Hans-Georg Merz (eds.), Kanzler und Minister 1949–1998. Biografisches Lexikon der deutschen Bundesregierungen, Wiesbaden: Westdeutscher Verlag, 2001, pp. 316–320.

External links
 
 

1908 births
1991 deaths
People from Stade (district)
People from the Province of Hanover
German-Hanoverian Party politicians
German Party (1947) politicians
Members of the Bundestag for Lower Saxony
Members of the Bundestag 1953–1957
Members of the Bundestag 1949–1953
Christian Democratic Union of Germany politicians
Ministers-President of Lower Saxony
Grand Crosses 1st class of the Order of Merit of the Federal Republic of Germany